Flávio Medeiros da Silva (born 10 February 1996), sometimes known as just Flávio, is a Brazilian footballer who plays as a defensive midfielder for Saudi Arabian club Al-Taawoun on loan from Trabzonspor.

Club career
Born in Santos, São Paulo, Flávio joined Santos FC's youth setup in 2006, aged ten. Released in 2012, he spent a year at Palmeiras before joining Vitória in 2014.

Flávio was promoted to the main squad in January 2015, after impressing during the year's Copa São Paulo de Futebol Júnior. He made his first team debut on 21 February, coming on as a second-half substitute in a 1–0 Campeonato Baiano home win against Colo Colo.

Flávio scored his first senior goal on 29 March 2015, netting his team's third in a 4–2 home win against América-RN, for the year's Copa do Nordeste. He made his Série B debut on 9 May 2015, starting in a 0–2 home loss against Sampaio Corrêa.

Flávio made his Série A debut on 29 May 2016, replacing Leandro Domingues at half-time in a 1–1 home draw against Atlético Mineiro. On 6 January 2017, he was loaned to Ferroviária until the end of the 2017 Campeonato Paulista.

On 31 August 2017, free agent Flávio moved abroad and joined Primeira Liga side Boavista FC, but only managed to appear 27 minutes for the B-team. On 20 December, he returned to his home country and signed for Santo André.

On 22 March 2018, Flávio moved to Vitória's rivals Bahia, initially assigned to the under-23s.

On 22 August 2020 he went to Turkish side Trabzonspor.

On 22 July 2022, Flávio joined Saudi Arabian club Al-Taawoun on a one-year loan from Trabzonspor.

Personal life
Flávio's twin brother, Fernando, is also a footballer and a midfielder. He too played at Santos as a youth.

Honours

Club
Vitória
Campeonato Baiano: 2016

Bahia
Campeonato Baiano: 2019
Campeonato Baiano: 2020

Trabzonspor
Turkish Super Cup (1): 2020

Individual
Campeonato Baiano Best newcomer: 2015

References

External links

1996 births
Living people
Sportspeople from Santos, São Paulo
Brazilian twins
Twin sportspeople
Brazilian footballers
Association football midfielders
Campeonato Brasileiro Série A players
Campeonato Brasileiro Série B players
Süper Lig players
Saudi Professional League players
Esporte Clube Vitória players
Associação Ferroviária de Esportes players
Esporte Clube Santo André players
Esporte Clube Bahia players
Trabzonspor footballers
Giresunspor footballers
Al-Taawoun FC players
Brazilian expatriate footballers
Brazilian expatriate sportspeople in Portugal
Expatriate footballers in Portugal
Brazilian expatriate sportspeople in Turkey
Expatriate footballers in Turkey
Brazilian expatriate sportspeople in Saudi Arabia
Expatriate footballers in Saudi Arabia